Ophisma albitermia  is a moth of the family Erebidae.

Distribution
It is found in Africa, where it is known from Eritrea and Zambia.

References

Ophiusina
Moths described in 1910